Gaylon M. Lawrence (March 15, 1934 – July 10, 2012) was an American businessman and farmer.

Lawrence owned more than 165,000 acres of farmland in Illinois, Missouri, Arkansas and Mississippi and was the owner of U.S. Airconditioning Distributors, the world's largest privately owned heating, ventilation and air conditioning distributor.  His family also owned five community banks and 30,000 acres of citrus farms, making his companies Florida's largest producer of fresh fruit.

From 1955 to 1960, he served in the U.S. Air Force.

References

1934 births
2012 deaths
American farmers
Citrus farmers from Florida
Iowa State University alumni
People from Piggott, Arkansas